Tarsius is a genus of tarsiers, small primates native to islands of Southeast Asia. Until 2010, all tarsier species were typically assigned to this genus, but a revision of the family Tarsiidae restored the generic status of Cephalopachus and created a new genus Carlito. 

All members of Tarsius are found on Sulawesi, while Cephalopachus is found on Sundaland and Carlito in Greater Mindanao.

Species 
Colin Groves and Myron Shekelle's 2010 revision of the family Tarsiidae recognized the following eight or nine extant species of Tarsius, being unsure as to whether T. pumilus was valid:
 Dian's tarsier, T. dentatus 
Makassar tarsier T. fuscus 
 Lariang tarsier, T. lariang 
 Peleng tarsier, T. pelengensis 
 Sangihe tarsier, T. sangirensis 
 Spectral tarsier, T. tarsier 
 Siau Island tarsier, T. tumpara 
 Pygmy tarsier, T. pumilus 
 Wallace's tarsier, T. wallacei 

The following two species were described by Shekelle Groves, and colleagues in 2017:
 Gursky's spectral tarsier, T. spectrumgurskyae 
 Jatna's tarsier, T. supriatnai 
In 2019 another species was described by Shekelle and colleagues:
Niemitz's tarsier Tarsius niemitzi

, Fossilworks also recognizes the following additional extinct species:
 Tarsius eocaenus 
 Tarsius sirindhornae

References

External links

Mammals of Southeast Asia
Tarsiers
Primate genera
Taxa named by Gottlieb Conrad Christian Storr
Taxa described in 1780